Sweet Injections is the third studio album by Norwegian singer-songwriter Bertine Zetlitz. The album was released on April 28, 2003 and produced by Howie B, Magnus Fiennes, Richard X and Yoad Nevo.

Track listing

Chart positions

References

2003 albums
Albums produced by Howie B
Albums produced by Richard X
Bertine Zetlitz albums